White Coffee Pot Family Inns was a  privately held Baltimore, Maryland, restaurant chain and coffeeshop that first did business in 1929 according to Polk's Baltimore City Directory. During the 1960s and 1970s, they opened a chain of fast-food restaurants White Coffee Pot, Jr. Major competitors included national chains Gino's (which sold Kentucky Fried Chicken), Denny's and Friendly's.

The last White Coffee Pot restaurant closed in Brooklyn Park, Maryland, in 1993. The company shared ownership with the Horn and Horn Smorgasbord Cafeteria chain, and some locations became Cactus Willie's all-you-can-eat restaurants.

See also
 Little Tavern, another Baltimore-based restaurant
 List of chicken restaurants

References

External links
 Ghosts of Baltimore website

Defunct restaurants in Maryland
Defunct restaurant chains in the United States
Poultry restaurants
1932 establishments in Maryland
1993 disestablishments in Maryland
Restaurants in Baltimore
Restaurants established in 1932